Washington Elementary School, or George Washington Elementary School, is an often-used name in the United States to honor George Washington, the first president of the United States.  The name may refer to:

 Washington Elementary School, Glendale Union High School District, Glendale, Arizona
 Washington Elementary School, in Bellflower Unified School District, Los Angeles County, California
 Washington Elementary School, in Corona-Norco Unified School District, Riverside County, California
 Washington Elementary School (Glendora, California),  Covina, California
 Washington Elementary School (Oakland, California), in Bushrod, Oakland, California
 Washington Elementary School, in the Riverside Unified School District, Riverside, California
 Washington Elementary School, in San Gabriel Unified School District, San Gabriel, California
 Washington Elementary School (Santa Ana, California), in Santa Ana Unified School District
 Washington Elementary School (Santa Barbara, California), in Santa Barbara Unified School District
 Washington Elementary School (Visalia, California), a school in Visalia, California
 Washington Elementary School, in Colorado Springs School District 11, Colorado Springs, Colorado
 Washington Elementary School (Elgin, Illinois)
 Washington Elementary School (Park Ridge, Illinois), in Park Ridge-Niles School District 64
 Washington Elementary School, in Davenport Community School District, Scott County, Iowa
 Washington Elementary School, in Olathe School District, Olathe, Kansas
 Washington Elementary School (Charlotte, Michigan)
 Washington Elementary School, in Wyandotte Public Schools, Wyandotte, Michigan
 Washington Elementary School, in Anoka-Hennepin School District 11, Anoka, Minnesota
 Washington Elementary School, in Bergenfield Public School District, Bergen County, New Jersey
 Washington Elementary School (Hawthorne, New Jersey), in Hawthorne, New Jersey
Washington Graded and High School, Raleigh, Wake County, North Carolina
 Washington Elementary School, in Fargo Public Schools, Fargo, North Dakota
 Washington Elementary School, in Jamestown Public Schools, Jamestown, North Dakota
 Washington Elementary School, in Minot Public Schools, Minot, North Dakota
 Washington Elementary School, in Valley City Public School District, Valley City, North Dakota
 Washington Elementary School, in Marietta City School District, Marietta, Ohio
 Washington Elementary School (Blackwell, Oklahoma), listed on the National Register of Historic Places (NRHP) in Kay County, Oklahoma
 Washington Elementary School (Medford, Oregon), listed on the NRHP in Jackson County, Oregon
 Washington Elementary School, in Hanover Public School District, Hanover, Pennsylvania
 Washington Elementary School, in Auburn School District, Auburn, Washington
 Washington Elementary School, in Whitewater, Wisconsin

See also
 Fort Washington Elementary School, Upper Dublin School District, Montgomery County, Pennsylvania
 George Washington Elementary School (disambiguation)
 Vare-Washington Elementary School, Philadelphia, Pennsylvania
 Washington District (disambiguation)
 Washington School (disambiguation)
 Washington School District (disambiguation)